Thaamarathoni is a 1975 Indian Malayalam film,  directed by  Crossbelt Mani. The film stars Prem Nazir, Jayabharathi, Adoor Bhasi and Bahadoor in the lead roles. The film has musical score by R. K. Shekhar.

Cast

Prem Nazir
Jayabharathi
Adoor Bhasi
Bahadoor
K. P. Ummer
Nellikode Bhaskaran
Philomina
Rajakokila

Soundtrack
The music was composed by R. K. Shekhar and the lyrics were written by Vayalar.

References

External links
 

1975 films
1970s Malayalam-language films